Shankarrao Chavan was sworn in as Chief Minister of Maharashtra for the second time in March 1986, on resignation of his predecessor, Shivajirao Patil Nilangekar. Chavan's cabinet served until his resignation on 26 June 1988, and subsequent replacement by Sharad Pawar's ministry.

List of ministers
The following is a list of ministers in Chavan's cabinet:

References

Indian National Congress
1986 in Indian politics
C
Cabinets established in 1986
Cabinets disestablished in 1988